Ismael Hernández (born 17 June 1946) is a Mexican racewalker. He competed in the men's 50 kilometres walk at the 1968 Summer Olympics.

References

1946 births
Living people
Athletes (track and field) at the 1968 Summer Olympics
Mexican male racewalkers
Olympic athletes of Mexico
Place of birth missing (living people)
20th-century Mexican people